The Pumping Station No. 2 of the San Francisco Fire Department Auxiliary Water Supply System was built in 1912. It is located near Fort Mason, at the northern end of Van Ness Avenue and close to the shore of the San Francisco Bay. It was listed on the National Register of Historic Places in 1976. The listing included a contributing building and three contributing structures.

It is a crucial component of the San Francisco Fire Department Auxiliary Water Supply System, which provided a water-supply system separate from the domestic water supply system.

It was designed by City Engineer Marsden Manson and was built by contractor Caldwell & Co.

References

External links

Pumping stations
Historic American Engineering Record in San Francisco
National Register of Historic Places in San Francisco
Mission Revival architecture in California
Buildings and structures completed in 1912